The Kwaw-kwaw-Apilt First Nation or Kwaw-kwaw-Apilt Indian Band is a band government of the Sto:lo people located in the Upper Fraser Valley region near Chilliwack, British Columbia, Canada.  They are a member government of the Stó:lō Tribal Council.

References

Sto:lo governments
First Nations governments in the Lower Mainland